In mathematics and group theory, a block system for the action of a group G on a set X is a partition of X that is G-invariant. In terms of the associated equivalence relation on X, G-invariance means that

x ~ y implies gx ~ gy

for all g ∈ G and all x, y ∈ X. The action of G on X induces a natural action of G on any block system for X.

The set of orbits of the G-set X is an example of a block system. The corresponding equivalence relation is the smallest G-invariant equivalence on X such that the induced action on the block system is trivial.

The partition into singleton sets is a block system and if X is non-empty then the partition into one set X itself is a block system as well (if X is a singleton set then these two partitions are identical). A transitive (and thus non-empty) G-set X is said to be primitive if it has no other block systems. For a non-empty G-set X the transitivity requirement in the previous definition is only necessary in the case when |X|=2 and the group action is trivial.

Characterization of blocks
Each element of some block system is called a block.  A block can be characterized as a non-empty subset B of X such that for all g ∈ G, either
gB = B (g fixes B) or
gB ∩ B = ∅ (g moves B entirely).
Proof: Assume that B is a block, and for some g ∈ G it's gB ∩ B ≠ ∅. Then for some x ∈ B it's gx ~ x. Let y ∈ B, then x ~ y and from the G-invariance it follows that gx ~ gy. Thus y ~ gy and so gB ⊆ B. The condition gx ~ x also implies x ~ g−1x, and by the same method it follows that g−1B ⊆ B, and thus B ⊆ gB. In the other direction, if the set B satisfies the given condition then the system {gB | g ∈ G} together with the complement of the union of these sets is a block system containing B.

In particular, if B is a block then gB is a block for any g ∈ G, and if G acts transitively on X then the set {gB | g ∈ G} is a block system on X.

Stabilizers of blocks
If B is a block, the stabilizer of B is the subgroup
GB = { g ∈ G | gB = B }.
The stabilizer of a block contains the stabilizer Gx of each of its elements.  Conversely, if x ∈ X and H is a subgroup of G containing Gx, then the orbit H.x of x under H is a block contained in the orbit G.x and containing x.

For any x ∈ X, block B containing x and subgroup H ⊆ G containing Gx it's GB.x = B ∩ G.x and GH.x = H.

It follows that the blocks containing x and contained in G.x are in one-to-one correspondence with the subgroups of G containing Gx.  In particular, if the G-set X is transitive then the blocks containing x are in one-to-one correspondence with the subgroups of G containing Gx. In this case the G-set X is primitive if and only if either the group action is trivial (then X = {x}) or the stabilizer Gx is a maximal subgroup of G (then the stabilizers of all elements of X are the maximal subgroups of G conjugate to Gx because Ggx = g ⋅ Gx ⋅ g−1).

See also
Congruence relation

Permutation groups